Yangko Dance is a 2015 Chinese television series directed by Guo Jingyu and produced by Shandong Film and Television Media Group. Starring Yang Zhigang and Yang Zi, the series was broadcast on Jiangsu TV and Tianjin TV from October 26 to December 4, 2019.

Synopsis 
A story inspired by Haiyang Yangge folk dance that follows a man who gets caught in the complications of family, love and revenge. In his journey, he transforms from a beggar to a hero who fights for his country.

In the year 1936, Hai Mao (Yang Zhigang) makes a living begging for alms on the streets as a fortune teller. His fate becomes intertwined with a young woman named Wu Ruoyun (Yang Zi). Eighteen years ago, pirate captain Hei Sha's (Zhao Hengxuan) parents were killed by Ruoyun's father Wu Qiankun (Wang Kuirong) and he is seeking revenge for their deaths. Hai Mao escapes with Wu Ruoyun in the night. Along the way, they encounter Wang Tiankai (Liu Zhibing) from the Communist underground who is on the run from his pursuers. Hai Mao carries Wang Tiankai on his back and nurses him back to health.

In the town of Hutouwan, the two great families Wu and Zhao have been enemies for generations. Hai Mao's arrival disrupts the yangke dance. He has come to look for his birth parents, and learns that he was born out of a forbidden romance between Zhao Yumei and Wu Mingyi, further complicating the story.

Cast

Main
Yang Zhigang as Hai Mao
Returned to Haiyang to find his parents but was caught in the complications of two big family. He transforms from a beggar to a hero who fights for his country.
Yang Zi as Wu Ruoyun
Young Lady of Wu family. She is kind, cute and patriotic. When Hai Mao was drowned in the sea Wu Ruoyun rescued him together with Zhao Xiangyu.
Wang Kuirong as Wu Qiankun
Patriarch of Wu family, one of the two big families in Haiyang. Wu Ruoyun's father.
Liu Qianhan as Zhao Xiangyu
A fisherwoman. She was the maid of Zhao Hongsheng's sister Zhao Yumei. Rescued Hai Mao together with Wu Ruoyun.
Wang Huichun as Zhao Hongsheng
Patriarch of Zhao family, one of the two big families in Haiyang. 
Xuan Lu as Huai Hua
Maid of Wu Ruoyun. She has a simple personality.

Supporting
Zhang Shaohua as Wu Mu
Liu Zhibing as Wang Tiankai
Liu Zhiyang as Zhao Zixuan
Chen Jie as Zhu Yeqing
Jia Yuanyuan as Chun Caoer
Niu Beiren as Zhao Dalu
Zhao Hengxuan as Hei Sha
Xiao Yin as Xiao Su
Kou Jiarui as Lin Jiayao
Jia Hongwei as Wu Tianwang
Niu Shengwen as Wu Guanjia
Xing Mao Ju as Lu Renjia
Bao Chunxiao as Lu Renyi
Yue Lina as Wu Xiangyue
Song Yi as Wu Ziyue

Ratings

Production
The series was launched on 27 July 2014. The filming took place in Beijing and Haiyang, Shandong province. After 344 days of filming, the series wrapped up on 5 July 2015 in Beijing.

Soundtrack

Reception
This series has received much attention since the beginning of its broadcast and it continued to dominate the screen. Within 21 days of its broadcast, it became the Provincial Television Prime Ratings Champion in Jiangsu and Tianjin Satellite TV, maintaining top 5 positions till the end of the broadcast. The drama was praised for its strong plots and excellent performances. The series has reached  over 6 billion online view.

Awards and nominations

References

External links

 Yangko Dance on YouTube
 Yangko Dance on iQIYI

Chinese period television series
Chinese war television series
Chinese romance television series
2015 Chinese television series debuts